Weird, True & Freaky (alternatively written as Weird, True and Freaky; Weird, True, and Freaky; or Weird, True, & Freaky) is a program that aired on Animal Planet in 2008 which focuses on unusual biology. Although some episodes center on unique animal behavior and traits, some focus on cryptids, animal-human relationships, experimental animals, humans who possess animal instincts, exotic breeds, surviving populations, etc. Weird, True & Freaky was produced by Hoff Productions.

Episodes

Season 1 (2008)

Season 2 (2009)

Season 3 (2010)

Reception
Common Sense Media rated it 2 out of 5 stars.

See also
List of programs broadcast by Animal Planet

References

External links
 by Animal Planet

2008 American television series debuts
2010 American television series endings
2000s American documentary television series
2010s American documentary television series
2000s American reality television series
2010s American reality television series
Animal Planet original programming
Television series about animals